Baberu is a constituency of the Uttar Pradesh Legislative Assembly covering the city of Baberu in the Banda district of Uttar Pradesh, India. Baberu is one of five assembly constituencies in the Banda Lok Sabha constituency. Since 2008, this assembly constituency is numbered 233 amongst 403 constituencies.

This seat belonged to Bharatiya Janta Party candidate Chandrapal Kushwaha who won in last Assembly election of 2017 Uttar Pradesh Legislative Elections defeating Bahujan Samaj Party candidate Kiran Yadav by a margin of 22,301 votes.

In the recent Uttar Pradesh Legislative Assembly election, Vishambhar Singh Yadav of Samajwadi Party won the seat by securing 79093 votes.

Election results

2022

References

External links
 

Assembly constituencies of Uttar Pradesh
Banda district, India